Garney Henley (born December 21, 1935) is an American former professional football player, who played in the Canadian Football League.

College career
Garney Henley attended Huron College in South Dakota, playing as a running back from 1956 to 1959. From 1956 to 1959, Henley was a running back on the varsity team. Meanwhile, Henry was named dean's List honor Student. In 1959, Henley broke a First Team NAIA All-America, records with 394 points and more than 4,000 rushing yards.

CFL career
Henley was drafted in 1960 by the NFL's Green Bay Packers in the 15th round (173rd overall), but was traded to  the Hamilton Tiger-Cats in Ontario, Canada. In his early Tiger-Cat career, Henley mostly played as a defensive back. In his later years with the Tiger-Cats, he played more commonly as a receiver. 

As a defensive back, Henley intercepted 59 passes for 916 yards and 5 touchdowns, and was selected as an All Star nine times. Following Henley's transition into an offensive player, he was an All Star for the 10th time in 1972 as a wide receiver. Henley won the CFL's Most Outstanding Player Award in 1972 in which the Tiger-Cats won the Grey Cup at their home field, Ivor Wynne Stadium, in Hamilton, Ontario.

He played in 7 Grey Cup games, winning 4: the 51st Grey Cup of 1963, the 53rd Grey Cup of 1965 (the so-called 'Wind Bowl'),  the 55th Grey Cup of 1967, and the 60th Grey Cup of 1972, losing 3: the 49th Grey Cup of 1961, the 50th Grey Cup of 1962, and the 52nd Grey Cup of 1964.

Post-football career
While still playing football in Hamilton, Henley was hired at the University of Guelph by athletic director, Bill Mitchell.  Henley served as the assistant athletic director,  advisor to the football team and taught in the Physical Education program. He also took over the Gryphon Basketball program.  Despite several winless seasons, Henley gradually developed the program into a highly competitive side. This culminated in 1973-74, when Henley coached the team to its first CIAU national championship.

Following his playing days, Henley became the athletic director and coach at Mount Allison University in New Brunswick, and Brock University in Ontario.  From 1989 to 1993, Henley was hired as defence coach with the Hamilton Tiger-Cats. As coach, he made another appearance in the Grey Cup in 1989, losing to Saskatchewan in the final minutes. He also served as the Director of Football Operations for the Ottawa Rough Riders from 1995–1996. His teams had a combined 6–30 record.  In 1996, Henley moved back to his home state of South Dakota after 36 years in Canada. He finished his career as an athletic director at his alma mater, Huron University.  After Huron University closed, Henley became General Manager for Professional Transportation Inc., transporting railroad engineers and conductors. He retired in 2013.

Henley's footballing career was celebrated when he was inducted into the Canadian Football Hall of Fame in 1979, the University of Guelph Athletics Hall of Fame on October 4, 1985, the College Football Hall of Fame in 2004, and the Ontario Sports Hall of Fame in 2015. Henley was voted the sixth greatest CFL player in a poll conducted by Canadian Sports network TSN in 2006.

Videos
Canadian Football Hall of Famer

References

Further reading
 

1935 births
Living people
People from Hamlin County, South Dakota
Players of American football from South Dakota
American football defensive backs
American football wide receivers
Huron Screaming Eagles football players
College Football Hall of Fame inductees
American players of Canadian football
Canadian football defensive backs
Canadian football wide receivers
Hamilton Tiger-Cats players
Canadian Football League Most Outstanding Player Award winners
Canadian Football Hall of Fame inductees
Ottawa Rough Riders general managers